"We Ride Tonight" is a song by Australian band The Sherbs, released in May 1982. It was released from the band's ninth studio album Defying Gravity. The song reached at number 26 on the US Mainstream Rock in June 1982. The song was written by the Sherbet band members Garth Porter, Tony Mitchell and Daryl Braithwaite. The B-side is "Some People".

Track listing

Charts

Cover versions 

French duo Daft Punk sampled "We Ride Tonight" on the song "Contact" from the 2013 album Random Access Memories, which was a number one album in many countries.

References

External links 
Sherbet - We Ride Tonight Lyrics*

Sherbet (band) songs
1982 singles
1982 songs
Festival Records singles
Songs written by Daryl Braithwaite
Songs written by Garth Porter
Songs written by Tony Mitchell (musician)
Song recordings produced by Richard Lush
Atco Records singles